Deldoul, Djelfa is a town in north-central Algeria.

Notes and references

Communes of Djelfa Province
Djelfa Province